Events in the year 2018 in Morocco.

Incumbents
 King: Mohammed VI
 President of the Government: Saadeddine Othmani

Events
1 October – dozens of migrants drown after a boat off the coast of Morocco sinks.
16 October – 2018 Bouknadel train derailment
17 December – Scandinavian tourists Louisa Vesterager Jespersen and Maren Ueland are murdered by Islamic terrorists in the foothills of Mount Toubkal near to the village of Imlil. At least one victim is beheaded with the murders recorded on video.

Deaths

13 January – Mohammed Hazzaz, footballer (b. 1945).

7 February – Brahim Akhiat, author (born c. 1941).

5 March – Robert Assaraf, historian (b. 1936)

22 April – Wiam Dahmani, singer and actress (b. 1983)

19 May – Houmane Jarir, footballer (b. 1944)

21 May – Max Cohen-Olivar, racing driver (b. 1945).

21 June – Hassan El Glaoui, painter (b. 1924).

7 August – Aaron Monsonego, religious leader (b. 1929).

20 September – Mohammed Karim Lamrani, politician and investor (b. 1919).

References

 
2010s in Morocco 
Years of the 21st century in Morocco 
Morocco 
Morocco